Kerris is a settlement in west Cornwall, England, United Kingdom. It is three miles (5 km) south-west of Penzance in the civil parish of Paul. Kerris means "fort-place" in the Cornish language.

Toponymy
In 1302 a document spells the name  Veor Keris and other spellings have been Kerres (in 1310), Kyrrys (1337), Vean Kerrys (1440), Keres (1481), Kyrris (1668). (Veor means large or great and Vean means little).

Antiquities
Several prehistoric relics can be found around Kerris including the Roundago (possibly an Iron Age hill fort) and the Kerris Standing Stone or menhir. Several fields away is the Tresvannack Stone which stands around 3.5m tall with a further 1.2m below ground. In 1840 a pair of urns were found under a slab of granite at the base of the stone. The urns are now kept at Penlee Museum, Penzance. Kerris cross was damaged during the English Civil War and repaired by a local blacksmith in the 19th century with iron pins holding the granite head in position. In September 2011 the corroded pins were replaced by stainless steel pins. Medieval crosses, in situ, indicate the route to the parish church.

History
There is a former manor house, which is a grade II* listed building dating back to the 17th-century, possibly using earlier walls. Kerris was under three different ownerships until 1694. when Richard Pearce bought the three parts, Major alterations were carried out in 1721 by his son Richard Pearce (1693–1753) and in 1743 John Hawkins became the owner  when Pearce and his wife, Maria, were declared bankrupt.

In 1882 the freehold farm Kerris was advertised for sale by auction. The property was bought by the owner of an adjacent tenement, Mr Thomas Bedford Bolitho, for £4,320.

A Weselyan chapel was opened in 1905.

Culture
Kerris Brass Band was in attendance at Sheffield's Methodist New Connexion, annual Sunday school treat in June 1883.

References

Sources

 

Hamlets in Cornwall
Penwith